John Benham (26 June 1900 – 10 January 1990) was a British athlete who competed at the 1924 Summer Olympics.

References

1900 births
1990 deaths
Athletes (track and field) at the 1924 Summer Olympics
British male long-distance runners
Olympic athletes of Great Britain
Olympic cross country runners